The A Millions Lights Tour was the debut concert tour by English recording artist Cheryl Cole. It promoted Cole's third studio album, A Million Lights. The tour marks Cole's first solo venture, touring extensively from 2005 to 2009 with pop group Girls Aloud. The show ran during October 2012, with 11 shows in the United Kingdom and Ireland.

Background
With the release of her latest album only one week away, the tour was announced via Cole's website on 12 June 2012.

Rehearsal for the tour began late August 2012 at Studio 1342 in Los Angeles. The sessions were cut short as Cole and manager will.i.am were involved in car accident during the early morning. The singer returned to the UK in an arm sling to complete promotional radio spots, with rehearsals continuing in London. During the radio spots, the singer stated the tour would feature will.i.am. and Wretch 32 at one of the concerts. She also stated costumes were being designed by Renelou Padora. During the final weeks, Cole and crew rehearsed the production at the Olympic Basketball Arena, before heading to Belfast. While in Northern Ireland, dancing Tre Holloway fractured his leg, causing him to be absent from the first three shows of the jaunt.

Critical reception
The tour received mixed reviews from critics and fans. For the debut concert in Belfast, Ashleigh Rainbird from Daily Mirror gave the show four out of five stars. She proclaims the concert was a "first night triumph".

At The O2 in Dublin, Ed Power of The Daily Telegraph gave the Irish gig three out of five stars. He states, "[T]hough her vocals were generally strong, Cheryl never imprinted her personality on the performance. At times the music felt like a calculating mash-up of chart trends—a little Rihanna here, a hint of Britney and Beyoncé there. How strange that, surrounded by state of the art production and dazzling costumery, one of the most recognisable women in pop should seem so faceless".

In London, André Paine writing for London Evening Standard gave the show three out of five stars, calling the show uneven yet ultimately enjoyable. He continues, "It was all over in 70 minutes and while Cheryl did just enough to justify her solo career, you suspect she's looking forward to being part of a girl group again". At the same concert, Robert Copsey from Digital Spy gave Cole's performance three out of five stars, saying the singer's performance was surprising flat. He says, "The flashes of brilliance in 'Under The Sun', '3 Words'—which featured a surprise appearance by friend and mentor will.i.am—and 'Fight for This Love' proved that she is capable of holding her own in front of a larger crowd. Though with a new book out and a number of well-publicised TV and film spots on the horizon, it proved all-too-easy to remember that she's a celebrity as much as a poster".

During the final shows at the Metro Radio Arena in Newcastle, Jessica Philips of Sunderland Echo called the homecoming concert triumphant but short. She also stated, "Her fellow Geordies were practically effervescent in their enthusiasm for their idol, chanting her name with all their might".

Broadcasts and recordings
Shortly after the tour was completed, a DVD release was issued for November 2012. In November, Cole had two specials airing on ITV2. The first was a behind-the-scenes documentary titled, "Cheryl: All Access Areas". The special showed footage from the London concert, along with rehearsals and intimate moments with Cole. The special aired 20 November 2012, to an audience of over 800,000 viewers. The second was an abbreviated concert special, filmed at The O2 Arena in London. The special, "Cheryl: Live in Concert—A Million Lights Tour", aired 25 November 2012. The DVD titled A Million Lights: Live at The O2, was released on 26 November 2012.

Set list
This set list is representative of the 3 October 2012 show in Belfast. It does not represent all dates of the tour.

Act One
"Sexy Den a Mutha"
"Call My Name"
"Girl in the Mirror"
"Promise This"
Act Two
 Girls Aloud Medley: "The Promise" / "Biology" / "Love Machine"
"Under The Sun"
"The Flood"
Act Three
"Parachute"
"Last One Standing"
"3 Words"
"A Million Lights"
Act Four
"DJ Section" (contains excerpts from "Let"s Get Down", "Heartbreaker", "Cockiness (Love It)", "Sexy and I Know It", "Gangnam Style", "Boys Lie", "Love Killer" and "Wanna Be Startin' Somethin'") (Dance Interlude)
"Ghetto Baby"
"Screw You"
Encore
"Fight for This Love"
"Call My Name" (Reprise) (contains elements of the Wideboys Remix)

Tour dates

Personnel

Band
Backing vocals: Alexis Strader, Renard Hughes
Dancers: 
Walter Holloway III (Tre)
Tyrell Washington
Felix Burgos
Marshall Lake
Brandee Stephens-Harris
Ambrya Underwood
Alex Larson
Aviel Ayoung
Vinceny Clemmons
Adrian Wiltshire

Management
Creative Director: Fatima Robinson
Set Design: Bruce Rodgers
Musical Director: Keith Harris
Choreography: Misha Gabriel, Beth Honan, Charm Ladonna, Adrian Wiltshire
Tour Production: Production North
Production Manager: Iain Whitehead
Stage Manager: Milan Rakic
Management for Rocket Pop Management LLp: Seth Friedman, Polo Molina, Lily Endland, Garry Tweedy
Agent For William Morris Agency: Solomon Parker

Crew

Styling: Renelou Padora
Glam: Lisa Laudat
Rigging Company: Over The Top
Rigger: Mark Wade
Set Carpenters: Chris Bridges, Graham Kearsley, Stephen Buckley
Lighting Company: HSL
Lighting Designer: Peter Burnes
Lighting Operator: Neil Trenell
Lighting Crew Boss: Johnny Harper
Lighting Technician: John Trincas, Chris Roper
PA Company: Wigwam Acoustics
FOH: Nick Warren
Monitor Engineer: James Baker
PA Technician: Rob Priddle, Jack "Ginger Joe" Murphy
Pyro Technician: Steve Britton
Video Company: VER, XL Video
Tour Video Director: Ruary Macphie
Video Engineer: Rod Martin
LED Technician: David "Chalky" White
LED Tech/Cameraman: Al Bolland
Projectionist/Cameraman: Danny Sheldon
Screens Content: Helene Spencer for The Field
Backline: James Wiffen
Wardrobe: Hadassah Boyde, Marge Christodoulou, Michele Potter
Catering Company: Snakatak
Caterer: Stephen Knuden, Robert Oliver, Matt Holland, Lisa Cribley
Promoter Rep: Maximus Burnham (UK), Turlough McShane (Belfast), Aiden Lee (Dublin)
Trucking Company: Stardes
Lead Truck Driver: Dave "Rambo" Ramsden
Truck Driver: Simon Sinclair, Neil Moran, Gary Bunfield, Robert Quinn, Roy Ladds, Michael Staniforth
Band Bus Company: Jumbocruiser
Band Bus Driver: Billy Higgs

Crew Bus Company: Four Season Travel
Crew Bus Driver: Malcom Farrey, Alan Watkins
Day Bus Company: Glen Marshalls for Marshalls
Travel Agent: Abgail Dillon for The Tour Division
Accountant: James Doran for Livewire
Tour Book Keeping: June Jones for CIA
Merchandising: Global Merchandising Services
Merchandising Rep: Keith "Pledge" Pledger
Legal: Nicola Harvey, Mauny Wright, David Oudot
Production Accountant: Kristen Hemmingway
Runners: Farah Riaz, Kyle Jamrozy, Mehren Ahmed
Production Coordinator: Christopher Woodhams
Audio Recording: Peter Theobald for Wigwam Audio
Audio Mixing: John Norten
Audio Mastering: Jonathan Last
Additional Lighting: PRG
Gaffer: Rich Gorrod
Lighting Crew: Lars Kirstiansen, Phil Sharp, Pete MacDonald, Simon Anderson
Arenamation: Helene Spencer for The Field
OB Company: Trick Box
Technical Manager: Liam Laminman
Key Engineer: Carl Own
Engineer: Paul Nancollis, Steve Grant
Engineer/Rigger: Clive Owen
Riggers: James Woods, Mark Davis, Nick Wilkes
Camera Assistants: Chris Hayden, Andrew Trewartha, Ollie Wesley
Focus Pullers: Sam Garwood, Oleg Poupko, Warren Buckingham, Jon Mitchell, Roger Bowles
Jib Assistant: Giles Mallard
Crane Technicians: Martin Elven, Jon Crawford
Grips: Jem Morton, Pete Muncey, Ken Ashley Johnson
Crane Operator: Dave Emery, Tony Freeman
Camera Operator: Rob Kar, Sam Keogh, John Simmons, Adam Rogers, Greg O'Callaghan, Dax De Bice
Music PA: Emily Aldous

Source:

References

External links
Cheryl Cole Official Website

2012 concert tours
2012 in British music
2012 in London
2010s in Birmingham, West Midlands
2010s in Glasgow
2010s in Manchester
21st century in Belfast
2010s in Dublin (city)
2010s in Liverpool
21st century in Newcastle upon Tyne
2010s in Sheffield
Cheryl (singer)
October 2012 events in the United Kingdom